Tatyana Sadovskaya (born 3 April 1966) is a Soviet fencer. She won a bronze medal in the women's team foil event at the 1992 Summer Olympics.

References

External links
 

1966 births
Living people
Russian female foil fencers
Soviet female foil fencers
Olympic fencers of the Soviet Union
Olympic fencers of the Unified Team
Fencers at the 1988 Summer Olympics
Fencers at the 1992 Summer Olympics
Olympic bronze medalists for the Unified Team
Olympic medalists in fencing
Medalists at the 1992 Summer Olympics